Pterotmetus is a genus of true bugs belonging to the family Rhyparochromidae.

The species of this genus are found in Europe.

Species:
 Pterotmetus dimidiatus Fieber, 1861 
 Pterotmetus parnassius Horvath, 1882

References

Rhyparochromidae